John Loder (c. 1726 – 1805) was a clergyman, landowner and founder of the Old Berkshire Hunt.

Family
Loder was a descendant of a family that were landowners at Princes Harwell in the time of Elizabeth I of England.

Education
He was educated at John Roysse's Free School in Abingdon, (now Abingdon School) c. 1735–1742. He was M.A. Oriel College, Oxford.

Career
Loder was the hunting parson who established the Old Berkshire Hunt  at Hinton Manor, where the kennels were located from 1760 to 1814. Loder passed on the mastership in 1800, to his son-in-law Robert Symonds.

He was rector of Hinton Waldrist and lord of the manors of Hinton and Longworth. He was the owner of Balstone Park in Hinton Waldrist.

He was a steward of the Old Abingdonian Club in 1758.

See also
 List of Old Abingdonians

References

1805 deaths
People educated at Abingdon School
Year of birth uncertain